Michael Everett Wyckoff (born March 5, 1994) is an American film composer, record producer, and pianist. He is also known by his stage name R!OT. Among his credits are Boneworks, Pitch Perfect 3, and Over the Moon. He has a platinum record for the single "Diamond", obtained in 2017.

Life and career
Wyckoff was born and grew up in the Los Angeles community of Van Nuys. He began taking piano lessons at the age of 4. Wyckoff attended California State University Northridge for Film Scoring.

In 2012, Wyckoff started his R!OT project by launching the youtube channel "riotedm", and began uploading original music and remixes performed on the Novation Launchpad. His videos gained popularity, giving him over 300,000 subscribers as of 2020. In 2014, his unofficial remix of Animals by Martin Garrix went viral and gained over 75 million views across various online platforms.

In 2013, Wyckoff met Brandon Laatsch. Wyckoff scored various films for Laatsch, and in 2016 Laatsch formed the video game company "Stress Level Zero" alongside Alex Knoll. Wyckoff was brought on as their composer to write the soundtracks for Hover Junkers (2016), Duck Season (2017), Boneworks (2019), And Bonelab with Jonathan LaMarche. Boneworks received high sales and acclaim, becoming the highest selling VR game at that date,

In 2013, Wyckoff was introduced to Christina Grimmie through a mutual friend, Jonathan LaMarche, and joined her touring band; he contributed keyboards so Christina, a known pianist, could focus on singing and interacting with the crowd. In 2014 his song with Miles Pinto, "Rinse It", was featured in the film Moms' Night Out. In 2015 he was asked by Toyota to create original music using only sounds recorded at their production facilities for their Gifony campaign. In 2016, Wyckoff produced the official remix of Fool's Gold by Aaron Carter, as well as Sit Still Look Pretty by Daya. The R!OT remix of Sit Still, Look Pretty was featured in the New York Times. R!OT was also asked to remix Keiynan Lonsdale's "Higher", Dirty South's "All of Us", and Jayceeoh's "Elevate".

In 2016 R!OT performed at Entertainment Weekly's Popfest, performing in between JoJo and Tove Lo. In 2017 Wyckoff produced official remixes for both Aaron Carter's Sooner Or Later on Sony Records and Christina Grimmie's Invisible on Republic records.

In 2017, Wyckoff was signed by Harvey Mason Jr. as a producer, and joined Mason's team in Korea to co-produce various Kpop tracks. Wyckoff, along with Mason and his team,  wrote "Diamond" by EXO which peaked at no. 1 on billboard, was no 1. on iTunes in 51 countries and sold over 2 million physical copies, "Vroom Vroom" by EXO-CBX which peaked at no. 2 on billboard and no.1 on itunes in 36 countries, "Butterflies" by Red Velvet which peaked at no. 1 on billboard, and "Hands on Me" which was featured on the tv show Produce 101.

In 2017 Wyckoff contributed music to Pitch Perfect 3 as well as programmed the Launchpad light sequences for all of Anna Kendrick's Launchpad scenes in the film. Wyckoff also contributed music to the films All Rise, Valley Girl and Over The Moon.

In 2018 Wyckoff composed the score for the Brian Skiba film, Chokehold. In 2018 Wyckoff produced "New Heroes" by Ten with Jon Asher and Shawn Hook, which peaked on Billboard at no. 4, and "Honest" by Key with Jon Asher and Dylan Bernard, which peaked on Billboard at no. 9.
Also In 2018, his Launchpad work as R!OT was featured in the documentary Pad Culture alongside other electronic artists Madeon, M4SONIC, Nev, Exige, and Kaskobi. In 2018 he released his collaboration with DMC world champion Yuto, "Inari", on Oyotodayo Records. Inari was featured in the Survios game "Electronauts".

In 2019 he scored the film Morok. His self titled track "R!OT" was featured in Season 1, episode 2 of Whiskey Cavalier. Also in 2019 his R!OT project was signed to Harvey Mason Jr.'s label Hundredup. His first EP under the label, "Hopeless", featured Jake Barker and Paula DeAnda.
In 2020 he co-scored the Bruce Willis film Hard Kill with Rhyan D'Errico and Jared Forman. He also produced the Tao single "Ice Cream" with Ryan Yoo and Fei Yu. He co-produced Christina Grimmie's posthumous single "Cry Wolf" with Marcus Grimmie and Jonathan LaMarche.

Discography

Production credits

Film credits

Television credits

Video games 

Selected R!OT Discography
 Fool's Gold (2016) – R!OT Remix
 Invisible (2017) – R!OT Remix
 Sit Still Look Pretty (2016) – R!OT Remix
 Sooner Or Later (2017) – R!OT Remix
 Wake Up to the Music (with Patrick John Lu) (2017)
 Inari (with Yuto) (2018)
 Sometimes Kinda of Love (with Jake Barker) (2019)
 Hopeless (with Jake Barker & Paula DeAnda) (2020)
 All Night in Brooklyn (with Jake Barker) (2020)

References 

1994 births
Living people
American film score composers
American record producers
American male pianists
Musicians from Los Angeles